The Squier Telecaster Custom is a model of electric guitar made by Squier as part of their Vintage Modified Series. It is essentially an affordable hybrid design that takes design features from both the Fender Telecaster Custom and the Fender Telecaster Deluxe. From the Custom it take its overall body shape, while from the Deluxe it has taken its pickup configuration of two humbuckers instead of the one humbucker and one single coil configuration that was used on the Custom. The Squier Telecaster Custom II includes two Duncan Designed P-90 pickups instead of humbuckers. Both models have 22 fret maple necks and were originally offered in either yellow or black with 3 ply black-white-black scratch plates. Controls on both models consist of two tone and two volume controls with a three way toggle switch on the upper bout. The bridge is a rear-loading six saddle design, similar to the type used on many non-trem Fender guitars.

Recently Fender have added a similar guitar to their Classic Player Series: the Telecaster Deluxe Black Dove. This guitar shares many similarities with the Custom II it that both models sport P90 pickups, black bodies and scratchplates, the four-knob-and-a-toggle-switch control layout and maple necks. On first appearances the only real difference seems to be that the Black Dove model has the large '70s Stratocaster headstock that the Deluxe originally featured but in fact the Squier sports Duncan Designed P90s while the Fender is fitted with a pair of Black Dove P90 pickups from which it gets its name.

As of 2016 Fender released the American Pro Telecaster Deluxe which is part of the American Professional series that replaced the American Standard Series. This model features a rib cage contour, a 22 fret maple neck and two Shawbuckers housed in Wide Range covers.

See also
Fender Telecaster
Fender Telecaster Deluxe
Fender Telecaster Custom

References

Electric guitars